Adoxophyes ergatica is a species of moth of the family Tortricidae. It is found on Mauritius and the Seychelles (Mahé, Silhouette, Coëtivy, Desroches).

References

Moths described in 1911
Adoxophyes
Moths of Africa